Agón is a municipality located in the province of Zaragoza, Aragon, Spain. According to the 2004 census (INE), the municipality has a human population of one hundred and ninety three.

Agón is one of the municipalities on the La Garnacha-Campo de Borja Wine Route.

References 

Municipalities in the Province of Zaragoza